Bruebach is a commune in the Haut-Rhin department in Alsace in north-eastern France. It forms part of the Mulhouse Alsace Agglomération, the inter-communal local government body for the Mulhouse conurbation.

See also
 Communes of the Haut-Rhin department

References

Communes of Haut-Rhin